The Philadelphia Story could refer to:

The Philadelphia Story (play), a 1939 play
The Philadelphia Story (film), the 1940 film adaptation
The Philadelphia Story (1959 film), the 1959 TV film adaptation starring Gig Young
"The Philadelphia Story", an episode of The Fresh Prince of Bel-Air